is a Japanese urban legend dating back to the 1990s, about a supposed village in Fukuoka Prefecture, whose aggressive residents refuse to follow the rules of the Japanese constitution. A real Inunaki Village, not connected to the legend, did exist from 1691 to 1889.

Legend 
According to the legend, Inunaki is a "small and easy to miss" village in a forest located in Fukuoka Prefecture, to the east of the Inunaki Mountain next to the most upstream tributary of Inunaki Gawa and the western edge of Wakamiya. The residents of the village refused to accept the Constitution of Japan. Near the entrance to the village, there's a handwritten sign reading "The Japanese constitution is not in effect past here." In order to find the village, one must take a small side road past Old Inunaki Tunnel. The original story takes place "sometime in the early 1970s" and follows a young couple, who were on their way to Hisayama when unexpectedly their car engine broke. They left their car and headed up the forest to seek help. They eventually entered a village that seemed abandoned. They were approached by a "crazy old man" who welcomed them to Inunaki before murdering them with a sickle.

There's another story related to the village, which tells of a telephone booth near the Inunaki bridge, which allegedly gets a call coming from Inunaki Village every night. The person that answers that call will be cursed and transported to the village. The victim of the curse will start to lose control of their body and mind before eventually dying.

The real Inunaki Village 

Bunnai Shinozaki was appointed as the village headman. The village's sources of income were producing ceramic products and steel manufacturing. A coal mine was established here later and a castle called Inunaki Gobekkan was founded in 1865 under the recommendation of Kato Shisho.

The site of Inunakidani was submerged in 1986, due to the construction of the Inunaki Dam (completed in 1994). Residents of the village were relocated to Wakita.

Origin and spread 

The area of the Old Inunaki Tunnel has been considered to be haunted due to a number of murder cases connected to this place. The tunnel's construction was completed in 1949. A new tunnel was constructed nearby in 1975. The unused old tunnel became dangerous due to a lack of maintenance. On 6 December 1988, five young men abducted and tortured a factory worker whose car they wanted to steal, burning him to death with gasoline inside the old tunnel. The perpetrators were arrested and sentenced to life imprisonment. The entrance to the old tunnel has been made inaccessible from both sides. In 2000, a dead body was found in a nearby dam.

The first online mentions of the Inunaki Village urban legend date back to 1999, when Nippon TV received a letter from an anonymous person, which described the legend of the couple murdered in the village and urged the Nippon TV crew to visit the place. The anonymous letter was titled "The Village in Japan That Isn't Part of Japan".

In popular culture 
The legend of Inunaki Village inspired several pieces of media. A horror film  (犬鳴村) directed by Takashi Shimizu, based on the legend, was released in February 2019. The release of the film contributed to the popularity of the Old Inunaki Tunnel, leading to an increase in trespassing and vandalism in the area. In November of the same year, a horror game titled  was released on Steam. The story also inspired a 2016 anime television series The Lost Village (迷家-マヨイガ-) and The Story of the Mysterious Tunnel (トンネルの奇譚) manga by Junji Ito.

See also 
 Oniontown, New York, a community partially known for the historically off-putting demeanor of its residents towards outsiders

References 

Japanese urban legends
Culture in Fukuoka Prefecture